Elk Island was a federal electoral district in the province of Alberta, Canada, that was represented in the House of Commons of Canada from 1988 to 2004.

Demographics

Geography

History
The electoral district was created in 1987 from Pembina and Vegreville ridings.

It was abolished in 2003 with parts being transferred mostly to Edmonton—Sherwood Park, Vegreville—Wainwright and Westlock—St. Paul ridings.

Members of Parliament
 1988-1993: Brian O'Kurley - Progressive Conservative
 1993-2004: Ken Epp - Reform (1993–2000), Canadian Alliance (2000–2003), Conservative (2003–2004)

Election results

See also 

 List of Canadian federal electoral districts
 Past Canadian electoral districts

External links 
 
 Expenditures - 2000
 Expenditures - 1997
 Elections Canada
 Website of the Parliament of Canada

Former federal electoral districts of Alberta